Theoharis Trasha (born April 21, 1985 in Elbasan) is an Albanian weightlifter, who with his younger brother Gert Trasha competed at the 2004 Summer Olympics in Athens, where he finished 12th.

References 

Albanian male weightlifters
1985 births
Living people
Olympic weightlifters of Albania
Weightlifters at the 2004 Summer Olympics
Sportspeople from Elbasan
21st-century Albanian people